Lakeside Academy may refer to:

Canada
 Lakeside Academy (Lachine), school in Lachine, Montreal, Quebec, Canada
Lakeside Academy (Buchans), school in Nova Central School District in Buchans, Newfoundland and Labrador, Canada

United Kingdom
Telford Park School, Telford, Shropshire, known as Lakeside Academy 2013-2015

United States
 Lakeside Academy (Belle Glade), school in Belle Glade, Florida, USA

See also
Lakeside School (disambiguation)
Lakeside High School (disambiguation)
Lakeside (disambiguation)
Lakeside College